Joseph Michael Orsulak (born May 31, 1962) is an American former Major League Baseball player whose career spanned from 1983 to 1997, with the Pittsburgh Pirates, Baltimore Orioles, New York Mets, Florida Marlins, and Montreal Expos. Orsulak, who threw and batted left-handed, played mostly in the outfield, although he played some games at first base. On the basepaths, he had better than average speed, until a 1987 knee injury slowed him down. He was traded from the Pirates to the Orioles for Rico Rossy and minor-league shortstop Terry Crowley, Jr. on November 6, 1987. He led the league in outfield assists, in 1991. In 1992, he made the first out at the Orioles' new Camden Yards ballpark, going on to lead the team that year in batting average. He elected to become a free agent on October 28, 1992 after five seasons with the Orioles. Despite his relatively long career (with five major league clubs), he never played in the post-season in the Majors.

Orsulak played winter ball for three consecutive years with Navegantes del Magallanes in the LVBP (Venezuelan Winter League), starting with the 1983 season, during which he met his future wife, Adriana Venditti.  They married during the 1988 All-Star break and had two children, Joseph and Michael.  After a long struggle with brain cancer, Adriana died in 2004.

Orsulak grew up in Parsippany–Troy Hills, New Jersey, where he graduated from Parsippany Hills High School.  He turned down a full scholarship to Seton Hall University in order to sign with the Pirates.

References

External links
, or Retrosheet, or Pura Pelota (Venezuelan Winter League)

1962 births
Living people
Alexandria Dukes players
American expatriate baseball players in Canada
Baltimore Orioles players
Baseball players from New Jersey
Florida Marlins players
Greenwood Pirates players
Hawaii Islanders players
Major League Baseball outfielders
Montreal Expos players
Navegantes del Magallanes players
American expatriate baseball players in Venezuela
New York Mets players
Parsippany Hills High School alumni
People from Glen Ridge, New Jersey
People from Parsippany-Troy Hills, New Jersey
Pittsburgh Pirates players
Sportspeople from Morris County, New Jersey
Vancouver Canadians players